Michael Bruun (born 8 October 1970) is a Danish handballer, previously the goalkeeper of Danish Handball League side Holstebro Håndbold . Bruun has made 92 appearances for the Danish national handball team, most notably participating in the 2002 European Men's Handball Championship, in which he won the bronze medal with the Danish team.

External links
 player info

1970 births
Living people
Danish male handball players